Los Angeles City Council District 15 is one of the electoral districts of the Los Angeles City Council and the only one to keep its boundaries generally the same since the districts were  formed in 1925.  

The 15th District was designed at its origin to represent the Los Angeles Harbor and Shoestring districts of the city, and over the years it has done so, although its northern boundary has been shifted to the south in keeping with changes in population. It has been the second-most stable in council membership. 

The seat was left vacant in 2011; Janice Hahn, the incumbent at the time, had been elected to the United States House of Representatives. She was replaced the next year by Joe Buscaino, who served until 2022. Buscaino ran an unsuccessful bid for Mayor of Los Angeles in 2022, and Tim McOsker won the election to replace Buscaino.

Geography

Present day district
The 15th district encompasses all of the city's southern area and the Port of Los Angeles. This includes the communities and neighborhoods of San Pedro, Wilmington, Harbor City and the Harbor Gateway. Watts borders the district to the northeast.

See official city map outlining District 15.

Historical boundaries

A new city charter effective in 1925 replaced the former "at large" voting system for a nine-member council with a district system with a 15-member council. Each district was to be approximately equal in population, based upon the voting in the previous gubernatorial election; thus redistricting was done every four years. (At present, redistricting is done every ten years, based upon the preceding U.S. census results.) The numbering system established in 1925 for City Council districts began with No. 1 in the north of the city, the San Fernando Valley, and ended with No. 15 in the south, the Harbor area.

The northern border of the 15th District was set in the following locations in these years:

1925: Slauson Avenue.

1928: Manchester Avenue.

1933. Stretches from Manchester Avenue on the north to and including Los Angeles Harbor on the south. Major eastern boundaries of the shoestring are Figueroa Street and Normandie Avenue and western limits are Western and Vermont avenues.

1935: Manchester Avenue or 92nd Street, with some parts of South Broadway and area detached to District 8

1937: Manchester Avenue.

1940: Irregular line with Manchester Avenue at the highest plane.

1986: Boundary moved south, but district still included part of the Watts area.

1987.  San Pedro, Wilmington, Harbor City, Los Angeles, the shoestring strip of Harbor Gateway and parts of Watts and South Central Los Angeles.

2011: South of Century Boulevard on the west edge of the Shoestring, north of the boulevard to the east.

Officeholders

Not only geographically, but also representationally the district has been one of the most stable. There have been only nine council members since 1925 — seven men and two women. None served fewer than four years. The thirty-year incumbency of John S. Gibson, Jr., was the second-longest of any Los Angeles City  Council member, after John Ferraro of the 4th District. 

The district "has long been represented" only by residents of San Pedro, which neighborhood, according to the Los Angeles Times, "despite accounting for less than one-third of the district's population has enjoyed outside influence as the district's traditional base of political power."

See also

 List of Los Angeles municipal election returns

References

Access to most Los Angeles Times links requires the use of a library card.

External links
 Official  City Council District 15 website

Los Angeles City Council districts
Harbor Gateway, Los Angeles
San Pedro, Los Angeles
Wilmington, Los Angeles